Must Be the Music is a 1996 short film written and directed by Nickolas Perry. It features American actor Milo Ventimiglia in his first starring role. The film premiered at the 1996 Sundance Film Festival and was distributed by Strand Releasing as a part of Boys Life 2.

Cast
 Milo Ventimiglia as Jason
 Michael Saucedo as Eric
 Justin Urich as Kevin
 Travis Sher as Dave
 Jason Adelman as Michael

References

External links
 

1996 films
American LGBT-related films
1996 LGBT-related films
1996 drama films
Boys Life films
Films directed by Nickolas Perry
1990s American films